Dellwood is an unincorporated community in Sauk County, Wisconsin, United States. Dellwood is located on Wisconsin Highway 23 southwest of Lake Delton, in the town of Dellona.

References

Unincorporated communities in Sauk County, Wisconsin
Unincorporated communities in Wisconsin